Kadapa Lok Sabha constituency is one of the twenty-five lok sabha constituencies of Andhra Pradesh in India. It comprises seven assembly segments and belongs to YSR Kadapa district.

Assembly Segments
Kadapa Lok Sabha constituency comprises the following Legislative Assembly segments:

Members of Parliament

Election results

General Election 1989

General Election 1991

General Election 1996

General Election 1998

General Election 1999

General Election 2004

General Election 2009

Bye-Election 2011

General Election 2014

General Election 2019

See also 
 List of constituencies of the Andhra Pradesh Legislative Assembly

References

External links
 Kadapa lok sabha constituency election 2019 date and schedule

Lok Sabha constituencies in Andhra Pradesh
Kadapa district